Vassil Iliev "Vasco" Evtimov (born 30 May 1977) is a French-Bulgarian former professional basketball player and head coach of BC Chernomorets in National Basketball League. A 2.08 m power forward, he played professionally in ten different countries throughout his career.

He is the son of Ilia and Rosalina Evtimov; his father was also a legendary professional basketball player, and his brother, Ilian Evtimov, is also a professional basketball player.

Player profile
After being selected as a 1996 McDonald's All American, Evtimov played NCAA Division I college basketball with the University of North Carolina. Although he saw limited action off the bench, he participated in two Final Fours with the Tar Heels.

Evtimov was recruited by the legendary coach Dean Smith and was then caught in the transition to coach Bill Guthridge. Despite this, his sophomore year Evtimov led his Tar Heel team in rebounds and points preseason until the NCAA deemed him to have had an unfair advantage by playing overseas for a professional team. He was given an 18-game suspension and returned to the team with 14 games left. Because of these circumstances, he decided to turn professional. He has played for teams in France, Greece, Italy, Spain, Slovenia, Russia, Ukraine and Cyprus over his ten-year professional career.

Vasco Evtimov was a key player for Maroussi BC when they won the Saporta cup in 2001, averaging 13,6 points and 12,6 rebounds during that tournament. Other clubs he has played for are Pau Orthez, Dafni BC, Maroussi BC, Skipper Bologna, PBC Ural Great, ASVEL Basket, CB Sevilla, Lottomatica Roma, KK Union Olimpija, Upea Capo d'Orlando, Climamio Bologna, CB Valladolid, Reggio Emilia, BC Khimik, Panionios BC, AEL Cyprus, Mitteldeutscher BC and Paris-Levallois Basket.

In February 2015, he signed with Levski Sofia. Evtimov announced his retirement in October 2016.

In 2019, 20 years after leaving the University of North Carolina early to turn professional, he fulfilled a promise to himself and finished his Communications degree at UNC, dedicating it to legendary basketball coach Dean Smith.

Coaching career

On September 16, 2020, Evtimov was hired by the BC Chernomorets as a head coach. In his first season, his team finnished fourth in the regular season, eliminated in the quarterfinals in the playoffs and eliminated in the first round of the Cup. In 21-22, he had similar results, fourth in the regular season, eliminated in the quarterfinals in the playoffs and eliminated in the first round of the Cup.

National team career
Evtimov played for the France national team at the EuroBasket 2001. He is also a member of the Bulgaria national team. Apart from players who acquired new nationalities due to political changes resulting from the fall of communism in Europe, he is the only player to ever compete at EuroBasket for two countries. He was selected to compete for the Bulgarians at EuroBasket 2009, where he was the team's leading rebounder.

Personal life
Evtimov has been married to Mary-Martha Evtimov since September 1999 and has three children, Nicholas (2000) and Maria-Grace (2003) and Liliana-Rose (2011).

References

External links
LNB profile

1977 births
Living people
ASVEL Basket players
AEL Limassol B.C. players
BC Khimik players
BC Levski Sofia players
BC Orchies players
Bulgarian expatriate basketball people in Spain
Bulgarian expatriate basketball people in Germany
Bulgarian expatriate basketball people in Greece
Bulgarian expatriate sportspeople in the United States
Bulgarian men's basketball players
Real Betis Baloncesto players
CB Valladolid players
Dafnis B.C. players
Élan Béarnais players
Fortitudo Pallacanestro Bologna players
French expatriate basketball people in Spain
French men's basketball players
French people of Bulgarian descent
French expatriate basketball people in Latvia
KK Olimpija players
Liga ACB players
Limoges CSP players
Maroussi B.C. players
McDonald's High School All-Americans
Mitteldeutscher BC players
North Carolina Tar Heels men's basketball players
Orlandina Basket players
Pallacanestro Reggiana players
Pallacanestro Virtus Roma players
Panionios B.C. players
Parade High School All-Americans (boys' basketball)
Metropolitans 92 players
PBC Ural Great players
Centers (basketball)
Power forwards (basketball)